The Gale River is a  tributary of the Ammonoosuc River in northwestern New Hampshire in the United States. Via the Ammonoosuc, it is part of the watershed of the Connecticut River, which flows to Long Island Sound. 

The Gale River flows for its entire length in Grafton County. It rises in the White Mountains in the town of Franconia as two short, northward-flowing streams: its North Branch and its South Branch. The two streams join in Bethlehem, and the Gale River flows thence generally westwardly. Returning to Franconia, the river collects the Ham Branch, its most significant tributary, then passes through Sugar Hill to Lisbon, where it joins the Ammonoosuc River.

The 1816 State map of New Hampshire calls the Gale River the "South Branch of the Ammonoosuck River". It may have received its local name because it flowed through the Gale Farm, as shown in a 1796 map of Franconia. A Henry Gale household was listed in the 1790, 1800 and 1810 Franconia NH Census.

See also

List of New Hampshire rivers

References

External links

Rivers of New Hampshire
Rivers of Grafton County, New Hampshire
Tributaries of the Connecticut River